George Osborne was an English cricketer who played for Derbyshire between 1879 and 1883.

Osborne played cricket at club level for Chesterfield and made his debut first-class appearance in a Gentlemen v. Players match in 1877, on the winning Players side. He joined Derbyshire in the 1879 season and played for the Derbyshire Colts in June. Shortly after, he made his first-class debut for Derbyshire against Lancashire. Osborne made 9 not out in the second innings and played three further matches during the season, picking up his career high score of 14 against Yorkshire. In the 1881 season he appeared in two games which were against Marylebone Cricket Club and Lancashire. In the 1883 season he played one game against Lancashire with an indifferent performance.

Osborne played 15 innings in 8 first-class matches with an average of 4.28 and a top score of 14. He took 1 wicket at an average of 39.00.

At the time of the 1881 census, the only individual of this name living near Chesterfield was a colliery banksman aged 26 born in Shelsfield Kent. He was living with a wife and son at Clowne.

References

Derbyshire cricketers
English cricketers
Players of the North cricketers